= Al-Wadi Al-Akhdar =

Lebanese food brand company

Al Wadi Al Akhdar
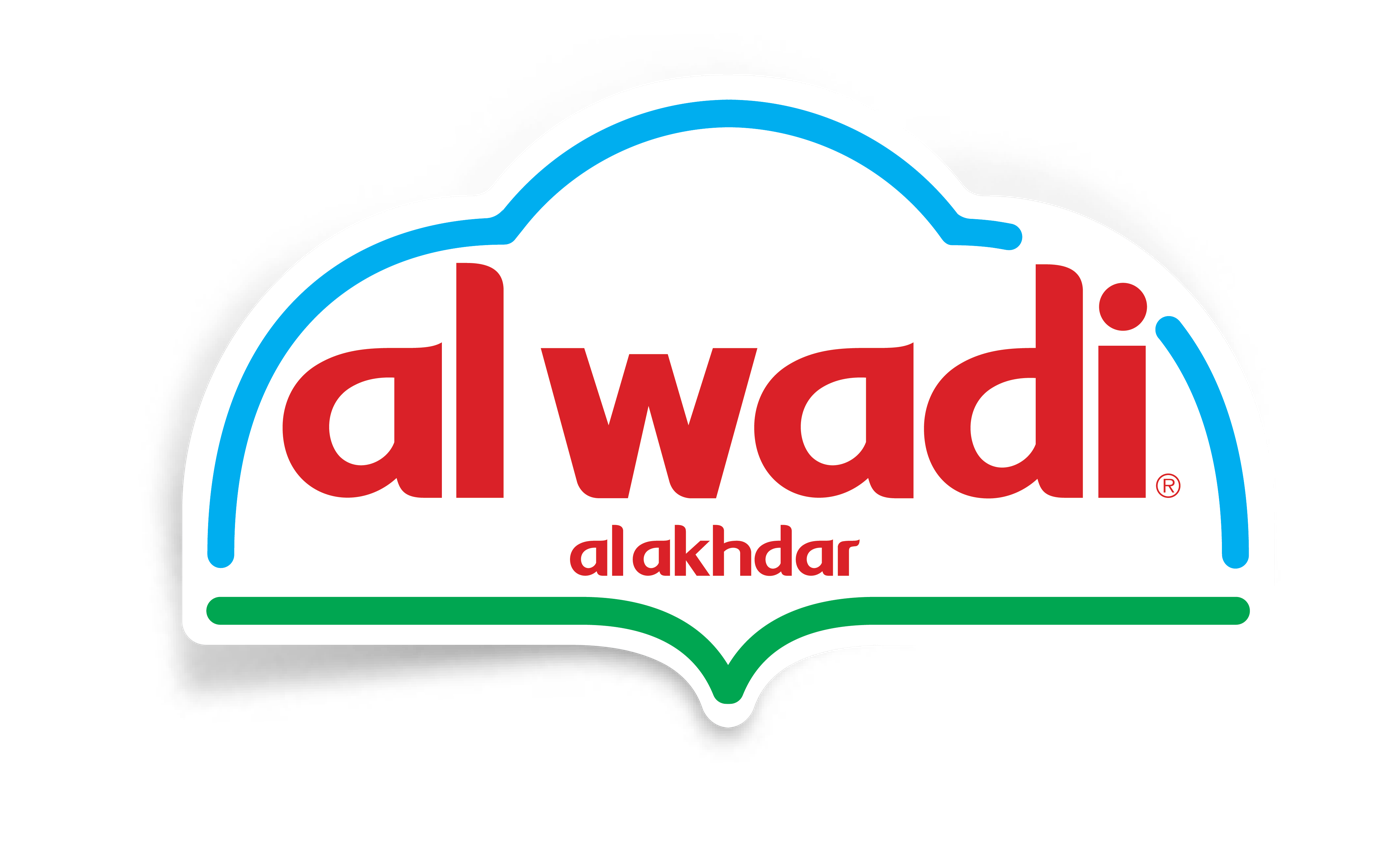
- Company type: Private
- Industry: Food manufacturing
- Founded: 1979; 47 years ago
- Founders: Bechara Obegi & Frank Farage
- Headquarters: Beirut, Lebanon
- Website: www.alwadi.com

Al Wadi Al Akhdar (Arabic: الوادي الأخضر, lit. 'The Green Valley') is a Lebanese food brand. It was founded in 1979 and has a presence in more than 25 countries. Al Wadi Al Akhdar product range includes over 150 products in 15 food categories, mostly within the Lebanese and Middle Eastern cuisine categories. The brand is part of the Obégi Group.

== History ==
- In 1979, Al Wadi Al Akhdar was founded by Bechara Obegi and Frank Farage during the Lebanese Civil War. The brand launched three products: Hummus Tahini (حمص طحيني)Ful Medames(فول مدمس) & Chickpeas.
- In 1980, the brand introduced canned vegetables. That same year, their traditionally-roasted Baba Ghanoush (بابا غنوج) was released.
- In 1992, Al Wadi Al Akhdar launched frozen vegetables.

== ISO ==
Al Wadi Al Akhdar received the Lebanese ISO 9001 certification during the late 90s and the Lebanese ISO 22000 certification in 2018.
